NGC 1172 is an elliptical galaxy in the constellation Eridanus. It was discovered by William Herschel on December 30, 1785.

References

External links 
 

1172
Astronomical objects discovered in 1785
Discoveries by William Herschel
Eridanus (constellation)
Elliptical galaxies
011420